Afinia Gemina Baebiana was the wife of Roman Emperor Trebonianus Gallus, who ruled briefly in 251–253.

Almost nothing is known about her life. She had two children, Volusianus and a daughter, Vibia Galla. After Trebonianus Gallus was proclaimed emperor by the soldiers, Herennia Etruscilla, widow of Emperor Decius, was allowed to keep the honorary title Augusta. Afinia Gemina Baebiana never was afforded the title and there are no coins of her either.

Her husband and son were murdered by soldiers in AD 253.

References

3rd-century Roman empresses
Afinii
253 deaths